Christian Mbulu (6 August 1996 – 26 May 2020) was an English professional footballer who played as a defender. During his career he played for Brentwood Town, Millwall (including loans to Canvey Island and Braintree Town), Motherwell,  Crewe Alexandra and Morecambe.

Club career

Brentwood Town
Mbulu began his senior career at the age of 17 when he signed to non-League club Brentwood Town in the 2013–14 season, following spells at fellow Essex-based clubs Thurrock and East Thurrock United.

Millwall
After a successful 2015–16 pre-season trial, Mbulu signed his first professional contract for Millwall on his 19th birthday, 6 August 2015. Mbulu rejected a contract offer from Colchester United where he had also been on trial. During his time at the South London club he attracted interest from clubs such Chelsea, Swansea City, Watford, and Crystal Palace and a loan spell to Braintree Town respectively. He spent three seasons at Millwall before they released him at the end of the 2017–18 season.

Loans
In January 2016, Mbulu joined Canvey Island on a one-month loan. Mbulu made three appearances during his time at the club.

In March 2017, Mbulu moved to Braintree Town on a month-long loan deal.

Motherwell
On 10 August 2018, Mbulu signed a one-year contract with Motherwell after his release from Millwall at the end of the previous season. In October 2018, Mbulu was named as Player of the Round for the third round of the Scottish Challenge Cup after scoring to help Motherwell's under-21 side to a 2–0 win against League of Ireland club Sligo Rovers. Mbulu made his league debut for Motherwell on 11 November, when he came on as a second-half substitute in the 77th minute of a game against Rangers at Ibrox. On 9 December, two Hearts supporters were arrested on suspicion of racially abusing Mbulu during a match at Tynecastle. On 21 May 2019, Motherwell confirmed that Mbulu would be released at the end of his contract on 31 May 2019.

Crewe Alexandra
On 30 October 2019, Mbulu signed a short-term contract with Crewe Alexandra until January 2020, making his debut in an EFL Trophy tie against Everton U21s at Gresty Road on 5 November 2019. He left Crewe Alexandra by mutual consent on 24 January 2020.

Morecambe 
Following his release from Crewe, Mbulu joined Morecambe on a deal until the end of the season, making his Morecambe debut in a 2–0 win at Walsall on 28 January 2020.

Personal life
Mbulu was of Congolese descent.

Death
Mbulu died on 26 May 2020, aged 23. Police were called to his home in Preston at 1:30p.m. and did not treat the death as suspicious. His team placed a picture of him on the substitutes bench during a visit to Chelsea in the FA Cup in January 2021 and at the Wembley play-off final against Newport in May 2021.

Career statistics

References

External links

 

1996 births
2020 deaths
Footballers from the London Borough of Newham
English footballers
Association football defenders
Braintree Town F.C. players
Brentwood Town F.C. players
Canvey Island F.C. players
Crewe Alexandra F.C. players
Millwall F.C. players
Morecambe F.C. players
Motherwell F.C. players
National League (English football) players
Scottish Professional Football League players
English Football League players
Black British sportspeople
English sportspeople of Democratic Republic of the Congo descent